Cryptothele may refer to:
Cryptothele (lichen), a genus of lichens
Cryptothele (spider), a genus of spiders